Loksa is a town and municipality in Harju County, Estonia, most known for its shipping industry.

The town is situated on the estuary of the Valgejõgi river, which drains into Hara Bay, Gulf of Finland.

As of April 1, 2022, the town had a population of 2471.

Etymology 
Loksa village, the town's namesake and predecessor, was first mentioned in 1631 as Lox. Later on, the village has also been referred to as Locksa and Loxa, until it became known as Loksa in 1798.

The name is speculated to come from the word loks(local dialect), which means either a marsh or a lake that dries up during the dry-season.

History
The village of Loksa was first mentioned in 1687 but this area is known in modern times as the village of Kotka.

The development of what is known these days as the town of Loksa started around 1874 when the landlords of Kolga established a new brickyard outside Loksa village. Around this factory a new market town was born.

In 1903, a shipyard was established, boosting the community's further growth. From Loksa, bricks were transported to Reval (now Tallinn), Helsingfors (now Helsinki) and Saint Petersburg. Although no ships were built in Loksa, the shipyard was heavily engaged in repairing ships from 1905 onwards.

By the end of the 19th century, there were 36 dwellings in Loksa. By 1934, their number had grown to 150. Loksa soon became the administrative centre of Loksa Parish which was part of Harju County until 1949 and of Viru County from 1949 to 1950.

From 1950 to 1957, Loksa was the administrative centre of Loksa District. After a new administrative reform in 1957 Loksa became part of Harju District.

The brickyard was closed down in 1981, but the shipyard continued to be expanded until the end of the Soviet occupation and remains the town's main employer.

With the restoration of the Republic of Estonia in 1991, Loksa became again a centre of the restored Loksa Parish and was elevated from market town to town on August 25, 1993.

Demographics

Since the beginning of the 1990s, the population of Loksa has decreased by more than one fifth. This has been mainly caused by growing unemployment, resulting from closure and downsizing of several companies not fit for new economic climate.

In 2000, there were 1,650 inhabitants in labor force, 750 of whom were working somewhere else.

As of 2011, Estonians made up 30.6% of the towns population and Russians 58.6%.

Religion

Education

The history of education in Loksa dates back to December 1867 when teacher Jakob Janter started to teach 20 children in a local farm house. The first schoolhouse was built in 1903, but this building burned down in 1927. Restoration work took two years and was completed in 1929.

With the influx of Russian workers in the late 1940s, three classes for Russian-speaking children were created in 1948. Loksa primary school was upgraded to secondary school in 1952 and renamed Loksa 1. Secondary School, the name it bears also today. Until 1988, both Russian and Estonian children studied in the same school.

In the end of the 1980s, both Russian- and Estonian-speaking community had grown big enough to justify creation of a second school. Loksa 2. Secondary School for Russian-speaking children was established in 1988 and is still operational, since 1996 under the name of Loksa Russian Gymnasium.

References

External links

Populated places in Harju County
Cities and towns in Estonia
Municipalities of Estonia
Kreis Harrien
Port cities and towns in Estonia